Charaimari is a village near Mushalpur town in Baksa district of Assam state of India.

Demographics
Pin Code of charaimariis 781377 which comes under nalbari postal division (Assam Circle)

References

Villages in Baksa district